Paul Jahren (17 January 1895 – 6 September 1963) was a Norwegian sport wrestler. He was born in Kristiania and represented the club Fagforeningens IL. He competed at the 1924 Summer Olympics, in Greco-Roman wrestling, when he tied 15th in the middleweight class.

References

External links
 

1895 births
1963 deaths
Sportspeople from Oslo
Olympic wrestlers of Norway
Wrestlers at the 1924 Summer Olympics
Norwegian male sport wrestlers